Ceiling Unlimited (later known as America — Ceiling Unlimited) (1942–1944) is a CBS radio series created by Orson Welles and sponsored by the Lockheed-Vega Corporation. The program was conceived to glorify the aviation industry and dramatize its role in World War II.

"Welles wrote, produced, and narrated this show, and his work was considered a prime contribution to the war effort," wrote the Museum of Broadcasting.

At the end of Welles's 13-episode contract (November 9, 1942 – February 1, 1943), Ceiling Unlimited was hosted by a variety of personalities including Charles Boyer, Joe E. Brown,  Ronald Colman, Marlene Dietrich, Cary Grant, Alan Ladd, William Powell, Basil Rathbone, Edward G. Robinson and writer James Hilton.

Ceiling Unlimited began as a 15-minute drama series broadcast Mondays at 7:15 p.m. ET. The program changed format for its second season, becoming a half-hour variety show hosted by Joseph Cotten. Retitled America — Ceiling Unlimited, the program featured vocalists Nan Wynn and Constance Moore, and music by Wilbur Hatch. The show aired Sundays at 2 p.m. ET beginning August 8, 1943, and ending April 30, 1944.

Production
 
Orson Welles returned to the United States August 22, 1942, after six months of filming in Latin America at the behest of the Office of the Coordinator of Inter-American Affairs and serving as what Welles termed "a kind of Ambassador extraordinary." Within weeks he began to plan two CBS radio dramas to be broadcast on consecutive nights: Ceiling Unlimited, and Hello Americans, a docudrama to promote inter-American understanding and friendship during World War II.

Ceiling Unlimited was a morale-boosting anthology of stories about heroic tales of aviation. Described by radio historian John Dunning as "aggressively patriotic," the program was sponsored by the Lockheed-Vega Corporation. There were no commercial breaks; the company was content to have just three one-line mentions throughout each show. It was noted in the contemporary press that as Lockheed and Vega had only one lucrative customer — the wartime Allied governments — they did not need to advertise.

"Its purpose, one of simple propaganda, was to boost morale within the industry in order to underpin the vast increase in productivity the war demanded," wrote Welles biographer Simon Callow.

"Ceiling Unlimited accomplished news reportage, entertainment and education while its ever changing format kept the listener interested in the material presented," wrote biographer Bret Wood. "The purpose was not to strike fear into the hearts of Americans or to develop overconfidence, but to exemplify a confident, knowledgeable attitude of the war effort and to make the public aware of the sacrifices necessary to win the war."

Lockheed-Vega established a research bureau in Washington, D.C., to develop story ideas and identify true stories in the files of disparate government agencies. For his part, Welles acquainted himself with the Flying Fortress and other aircraft at the Lockheed-Vega plants in California, wrote biographer Frank Brady: "Sporting an employee's identification badge and wearing a silver-colored hard hat, he poked his nose into machinery, ate box lunches with executives, and talked to the workers on the assembly lines. He became enmeshed in the love of flight."

Welles titled the series Ceiling Unlimited. "He thought it both romantic and evocative," wrote biographer Frank Brady, "but the sponsors disagreed. For weeks, in publicity releases and other references the program was called 'the new Orson Welles Show,' and it wasn't until two days before the broadcast, when it appeared that Orson would not relent, that Ceiling Unlimited became official."

Playwright Arthur Miller was one of the writers for the show, and Welles asked him to create its format. Miller and Welles were the same age, 27; both were veterans of the Federal Theatre Project and they worked together easily. They had worked together once before; Welles performed a nuanced drama about Benito Juárez — Juarez: Thunder from the Hills, a verse play written by Miller — before a live audience on the September 28, 1942, broadcast of Cavalcade of America.

Ceiling Unlimited began November 9, 1942. Each week, announcer Pat McGeehan repeated, "Man has always looked to the heavens for help and inspiration, and from the skies too will come his victory and his future." Welles cast many of his Mercury Theatre company of actors, including Ray Collins, Joseph Cotten, Agnes Moorehead and Everett Sloane. Bernard Herrmann created the music for the first 13 shows.

Welles's run on the program overlapped with his other CBS radio series, Hello Americans, which was broadcast on Sunday nights while Ceiling Unlimited aired on Monday nights. His radio success was "a psychic exhilarant" for Welles, wrote biographer Frank Brady: "After the difficulties of It's All True and the discredit of Ambersons, compounded by the humiliation of being turned away by RKO, he began to regain his confidence with the positive radio reviews that appeared across the nation."

"Ceiling Unlimited demonstrated Welles's talent when taken to extremes," summarized biographer Bret Wood. "Fifteen minutes was hardly enough time to accomplish the different goals set forth, but he did his best to cover the spectrum of emotions and topics, sometimes to great effect but more often with campy results. The context in which the program was originally heard can never be recreated, so Ceiling Unlimited is impossible to objectively assess. Its sister program Hello Americans is less dated and for various reasons is superior to its less subdued counterpart."

Welles left Ceiling Unlimited at the end of his 13-episode contract, concluding the broadcast on February 1, 1943, with a statement: "For a while, the Mercury Theatre is going off the air. Next week my friend Ronald Colman will tell you the story about the Douglas Dauntless, the world's greatest dive bomber. We very much wish it were possible to go on writing and producing these radio plays. We've never been happier. … We leave with real regret."

Welles began filming on Jane Eyre, which he was producing and starring in, on February 3, 1943, while also beginning preparations for The Mercury Wonder Show, a 1943 magic-and-variety stage show for U.S. soldiers.

Guest hosts

Ronald Colman was the guest host on the February 8, 1943, edition of Ceiling Unlimited, the first to be broadcast after Welles's departure. Future shows of the season would continue to use celebrity guest hosts, including Marlene Dietrich, Alan Ladd, Brian Donlevy, Frank Morgan, Ralph Morgan, Basil Rathbone, Robert Young, Cary Grant, Claire Trevor, Edward G. Robinson, Adolphe Menjou, and Walter Abel.

From June 28 through August 2, 1943, Ceiling Unlimited was hosted by author James Hilton. Reviewing a July broadcast, Billboard wrote, "Hilton's ceiling is zero-zero ... Like many other ideas, James Hilton as a radio program sounded like a million dollars on paper and a thin dime on the air." Hilton published Ceiling Unlimited (1943), a boxed limited edition of 100 signed copies of his six scripts for the program.

Second season

The second season of the series began August 8, 1943 and followed more of a musical/variety format, with the series retitled America — Ceiling Unlimited. It was presented by Welles's friend and collaborator Joseph Cotten. It contained 39 episodes, the last of which was broadcast on April 30, 1944.

Such were the differences from the first season format that Old Time Radio enthusiast website The Digital Deli argues, "Any attempt to simply conflate Ceiling Unlimited and America, Ceiling Unlimited is just silly. They're entirely different formats … The only elements common to both programs were their sponsor and the phrase, Ceiling Unlimited".

John Steinbeck stories
As part of the January 25, 1943, episode of Ceiling Unlimited, Welles presented a John Steinbeck short story written specifically for broadcast. Titled "With Your Wings" (sometimes appearing as "Flyer Come Home with Your Wings") it relates the homecoming of a decorated pilot, later revealed to be black, and his realization of the meaning that his achievement has for his family and community. The script and recording are included with the Orson Welles materials at the Lilly Library. Welles presented the story once more, to conclude the final episode of his CBS radio series, The Orson Welles Almanac, broadcast July 19, 1944.

Virtually forgotten, the story was published in November 2014, after a transcript of the broadcast was found in the archives of the University of Texas at Austin by Andrew Gulli, managing editor of The Strand Magazine. "With Your Wings" appeared in the quarterly magazine's holiday issue. "To the best of my knowledge, and that of the Steinbeck estate, it's never been published before," Gulli wrote.

Another Steinbeck story, "Letter to Mother", was presented on Ceiling Unlimited January 18, 1943. The Lilly Library also holds this manuscript and recording with its Orson Welles materials.

In addition to working for the Writers' War Board, Steinbeck was one of the writers who contributed to the Voice of America, a service of the United States Office of War Information. John Houseman, Welles's erstwhile partner in the Mercury Theatre, was chief of radio programming for the Overseas Branch of the OWI and ran the Voice of America from February 1942 through June 1943.

Episodes
The vast majority of episodes are believed to be missing, although they may still exist in private collections. Currently, six first-season episodes and four second-season episodes are in circulation among fans of Old Time Radio.

Ceiling Unlimited
Recordings of 12 of the 13 Ceiling Unlimited programs produced by Orson Welles are in the collection of the Lilly Library at Indiana University Bloomington. Missing from the collection is the broadcast of December 7, 1942, in which Welles reads Norman Rosten's poem, Back to Bataan; only the bound script is in the collection. A trial recording of the first program, "Flying Fortress", can be heard at the Old Time Radio Researchers Group Library.

"War Workers" is one of four of Welles's wartime radio broadcasts included as supplementary material in the Kino Classics restoration of The Stranger (1946), released on DVD and Blu-ray Disc in October 2013.

America — Ceiling Unlimited
Beginning Sunday, August 8, 1943, Joseph Cotten hosted the 30-minute variety series still sponsored by Lockheed and Vega but now titled America — Ceiling Unlimited. In his 1987 autobiography, Cotten recalled that at the end of the first broadcast he was summoned to the control booth for a telephone call: "It was Groucho Marx. He congratulated me and said that he had not only enjoyed the show, but had also been completely sold by the commercial. 'Just where can I buy a P-38?' he asked."

Notes

References

External links
 Ceiling Unlimited at the Internet Archive
 Ceiling Unlimited at The Digital Deli

1942 radio programme debuts
1944 radio programme endings
1940s American radio programs
CBS Radio programs
Works by Orson Welles
World War II propaganda
American variety radio series
Anthology radio series
Aviation radio series